Raymond Getliffe (April 3, 1914 – June 15, 2008) was a Canadian professional ice hockey left winger who played 10 seasons in the National Hockey League for the Boston Bruins and Montreal Canadiens. Born in Galt, Ontario (now Cambridge, Ontario), he played with the Saint John St. Peters.  At the time of his death he was believed to be the oldest living former Montreal Canadiens player. Getliffe's name is on the Stanley Cup twice, for 1939 with Boston and 1944 with Montreal. On February 6, 1943 while playing for the Canadiens he scored five goals in one game.

After finishing his playing career, Getliffe briefly officiated in the NHL.  Retired from hockey, Getliffe and his wife Lorna remained in Montreal until moving to London, Ontario in 1990, where he grew up.

Getliffe died in London of liver cancer at age 94. At the time of his death, reports claimed that he was the oldest living NHL alumnus, about four months older than ex-New York Ranger and Chicago Blackhawk Clint Smith. These reports, however, overlooked players who had only played a certain number of games, such as Louis Holmes and Al Suomi.

Career statistics

Regular season and playoffs

See also

List of players with 5 or more goals in an NHL game

References

External links

Ray Getliffe Get his Day With the Stanley Cup

1914 births
2008 deaths
Boston Bruins players
Boston Cubs players
Canadian ice hockey left wingers
Deaths from cancer in Ontario
Deaths from liver cancer
London Tecumsehs players
Montreal Canadiens players
Stanley Cup champions
Ice hockey people from Ontario
Sportspeople from Cambridge, Ontario